ATBO (an acronym for At The Beginning of Originality) is a South Korean boy group formed in 2022 through IST Entertainment's survival competition The Origin – A, B, Or What?. The group is composed of seven members: Oh Jun-seok, Ryu Jun-min, Bae Hyun-jun, Seok Rak-won, Jeong Seung-hwan, Kim Yeon-kyu and Won Bin. The group officially debuted on July 27, 2022, with the extended play The Beginning : 開花.

Name
"ATBO" is an initial of At The Beginning of Originality which  means the start of a dream. The name was originally "ABO", but was changed due to fan concern as the original name is a racial slur in some regions.

History

Pre-debut
Yeonkyu was a YG Entertainment trainee who participated in YG Treasure Box, but did not make it into the show's final debut lineup.

On February 6, it was reported that IST Entertainment, home to male idol groups Victon and The Boyz as well as female idol group Apink and Weeekly, was planning to debut their first boy group under the new company name in the first half of the year.

On February 10, it was announced that the members would be selected from a group of 13 trainees through a survival program jointly produced with Kakao Entertainment and Sony Music Solutions.

On the final episode aired on May 7, 2022, it was announced that the final seven contestants would debut as ATBO.

On June 13, 2022, IST Entertainment announced that Yang Donghwa would not be debuting as a member of ATBO after his past misconduct when he was a student surfaced online. On June 17, 2022, IST Entertainment announced that Won Bin, who was originally eliminated in episode 5, would be debuting with ATBO in replacement of Donghwa.

2022–present: Debut with The Beginning: 開花
ATBO made their official debut on July 27, 2022, with the release of their debut EP, The Beginning: 開花, which can be roughly translated to "blooming flower".

Members
 Oh Junseok (오준석) – leader
 Ryu Junmin (류준민)
 Bae Hyunjun (배현준)
 Seok Rakwon (석락원)
 Jeong Seunghwan (정승환)
 Kim Yeonkyu (김연규)
 Won Bin (원빈)

Discography

Extended plays

Singles

Videography

Music videos

Filmography

Television shows

Awards and nominations

References

External links
  

K-pop music groups
South Korean boy bands
IST Entertainment artists
2022 establishments in South Korea
South Korean dance music groups
Musical groups established in 2022
Peak Time contestants